WOPI-CD, virtual channel 19 (VHF digital channel 11), is a low-power, Class A television station licensed to both Bristol, Virginia and Kingsport, Tennessee, United States. It is a translator of Kingsport-licensed Cozi TV affiliate WKPT-TV (channel 19) which is owned by the Glenwood Communications Corporation. WOPI-CD's transmitter is located on Holston Mountain in the Cherokee National Forest; its parent station maintains studios on Commerce Street in downtown Kingsport.

History

WOPI has been simulcasting the third digital subchannel of WKPT-TV since October 1, 2007. It was an affiliate of America One until December 21, 2007; it then carried the Retro Television Network until 2014, and Cozi TV until January 2017 (Cozi programming is now seen on WKPT-TV's primary channel). Prior to the simulcast, WOPI's schedule consisted of infomercials and programming from the Pentagon Channel. In recent years, WOPI-CA has been carried on cable in multiple areas within the Knoxville media market in Kentucky.

Technical information

Subchannels
The station's digital signal is multiplexed:

References

External links

OPI-CD
Television channels and stations established in 1992
Low-power television stations in the United States